Bay and Basin 92.7FM (call sign: 2BAB) is a permanent licensed community radio station based in Sanctuary Point, on the New South Wales South Coast, Australia. It is licensed to serve the towns of Vincentia, Sanctuary Point, Huskisson, St Georges Basin and Basin View and surrounding villages, on the frequency of 92.7 FM. The signal can be received from Gerringong to Ulladulla.

Overview 
The station is run by BCR Communities formerly Bay and Basin Community Resources, a not-for-profit charitable organisation that delivers a range of home and community based programs throughout the Bay & Basin region, Shoalhaven and Illawarra. Original programming is produced and presented by volunteers, whilst other programs from Australian based community stations are taken off the Community Radio Network satellite. The station regularly conducts outside broadcasts for community events and fundraisers.

Programming 
An eclectic format prevails, with volunteer presenters selecting their own music. The station has a strong focus on partnering with local schools to provide Youth radio and school based radio programs.

The station broadcasts 24/7 and webstreams live and has an active program of outside broadcasts.

References 

6- Submission to Parliament re. power increase
7- Sanctuary Point License Area
8- Variation to Nowra License Area Plan.
9- Australia Day in the Shoalhaven

Radio stations in New South Wales
Community radio stations in Australia
Radio stations established in 2006